Episodes for the British sitcom Are You Being Served? aired from 1972 to 1985. All episodes were 30 minutes long. There was a film in 1977, also entitled Are You Being Served?. While all episodes were in colour, the pilot had originally survived only in black-and-white as a film transfer from the original colour source; however, it was restored into colour using the chroma dots computer colour restoration technique and was aired on BBC Two on 1 January 2010.

Series overview

Episodes

Pilot (1972)

Series 1 (1973)

Series 2 (1974)

Series 3 (1975)

Series 4 (1976)

Series 5 (1977)

Series 6 (1978)

Series 7 (1979)

Series 8 (1981)

Series 9 (1983)
Note: David Croft did return for the final read through and added additional material to the scripts.

Series 10 (1985)

Special (2016)

References

Bibliography
 Richard Webber, "I'm Free! – The Complete Are You Being Served?", Orion Books, 1999

External links
 List of Are You Being Served? episodes at EpGuides.com
 
 

Episodes
Are You Being Served?
Are You Being Served?